Macroparalepis is a genus of barracudina.

Species
There are currently six recognized species in this genus:
 Macroparalepis affinis Ege, 1933
 Macroparalepis brevis Ege, 1933
 Macroparalepis danae Ege, 1933
 Macroparalepis johnfitchi (Rofen, 1960)
 Macroparalepis macrogeneion Post, 1973 (Longfin barracudina)
 Macroparalepis nigra (Maul, 1965)

References

Paralepididae